Amedeo Della Valle (born April 11, 1993) is an Italian professional basketball player for Basket Brescia Leonessa of the Italian Lega Basket Serie A. He attended Findlay Prep in Henderson, Nevada before spending two seasons playing college basketball for the Ohio State University.

High school career
Wanting to develop his basketball in a different way, he moved to the United States in 2011, to Findlay Prep high school in Henderson, Nevada. There, he was a starter in their National High School Invitational victory in 2012, breaking the school record for three-pointers in a season, with 66.

College career
This caught the eye of several colleges and, after graduating, he signed a letter of intent to play for Ohio State in the Big Ten Conference of the NCAA Division I, choosing them over scholarship offers from Arizona and Texas A&M.  
The only player recruited that year by Ohio State, Amedeo took some time to adapt to the rigours of college basketball, especially the physical side having never done weights in the past, he was exclusively used as a bench player in his freshman season.
Having put on weight for his sophomore season he started earning more game time although he stayed a bench option, he notably was decisive in overturning an 18-point, second-half deficit to beat Nebraska in the quarter-finals of the Big Ten tournament in what is regarded as his best game for the team.  
After Ohio State's elimination in the first round of the NCAA Division I tournament against Dayton he announced his intention to return to Italy to play professional basketball.

College statistics

|-
| style="text-align:left;"| 2013
| style="text-align:left;" rowspan=2| Ohio State
| 15 || 0 || 7.2 || 37.5 || 38.5 || 50.0 || 1.47 || 0.26 || 0.26 || 0.4 || 2.5
|-
| style="text-align:left;"| 2014
| 33 || 0 || 11.9 || 34.7 || 32.4 || 65.8 || 1.76 || 0.18 || 0.21 || 0.24 || 4.0
|- class="sortbottom"
| style="text-align:left;"| Career
| style="text-align:left;"|
| 48 || 0 || 9.55 || 36.1 || 35.45 || 57.9 || 1.61 || 0.22 || 0.23 || 0.32 || 3.25

Professional career
Della Valle returned to Italy, joining Serie A and EuroCup-playing side Grissin Bon Reggio Emilia declaredly because of the team's policy of trusting young Italian players, signing a contract until 2019.
During his career Della Valle was named LBA All-Star (2014), Italian Supercup MVP (2015) and All-EuroCup First Team (2018) and he won the EuroChallenge (2014) and the Italian Supercup (2015).

On June 16, 2018, the president of Olimpia Milano, Livio Proli, said the club reached an agreement with Della Valle for the 2018–19 season. On June 22, 2018, Olimpia Milano officially announced Della Valle as new player.

On July 11, 2020, he has signed with Herbalife Gran Canaria of the Spanish Liga ACB. After six games, he parted ways with the team on October 23. Della Valle subsequently signed with Budućnost of the Adriatic League.

Della Valle returned to Italy for the season 2021-22 with Basket Brescia Leonessa. He was announced on June 23rd, 2021.

National team career
Della Valle started playing for the youth squads of the Italian national team, first with the Under-16's in 2009. He notably won the gold medal with the U20's at the 2013 European Championship where he was an important contributor winning the MVP award.

He was called up to the squad that would take part in EuroBasket 2015 to start on 5 September.

Personal life
His father is Carlo Della Valle , who had a career in the first division, he also was a guard noted for compensating his lack of athleticism with excellent technique.

Amedeo originally had no plans of going abroad to play, but a holiday in Miami with his mother in 2006 motivated him to move to the U.S. for lifestyle and athletic reasons.

Della Valle, a crowd favourite at Ohio State University due to his atypical look and personality, unsuccessfully ran for student-body president in a less than serious campaign in 2014, promises such as official Amedeo snow days took him to fifth place.

"La Faccia Cattiva di Amedeo Della Valle", a Facebook page with almost 13.000 followers and a clothing brand, is based on his trademark three-pointer celebration.

Career statistics

Euroleague

|-
| style="text-align:left;" | 2018–19
| style="text-align:left;" | Olimpia Milano
| 12 || 0 || 6.0 || .364 || .357 || 1.000 || 0.8 || 0.3 || 0.1 || 0.2 || 2.1 || 1.8

References

1993 births
Living people
2019 FIBA Basketball World Cup players
A.S. Junior Pallacanestro Casale players
CB Gran Canaria players
Findlay Prep alumni
Italian expatriate basketball people in Spain
Italian expatriate basketball people in the United States
Italian men's basketball players
Lega Basket Serie A players
Ohio State Buckeyes men's basketball players
Olimpia Milano players
Pallacanestro Reggiana players
People from Alba, Piedmont
Point guards
Shooting guards
Sportspeople from the Province of Cuneo